Anja Van Damme (born ) was a Belgian female volleyball player, playing as an outside hitter. She was part of the Belgium women's national volleyball team.

She competed at the 2007 Women's European Volleyball Championship. On club level she played for Asteríx Kieldrecht in 2007.

References

External links
http://www.cev.lu/Competition-Area/PlayerDetails.aspx?TeamID=5052&PlayerID=2304&ID=366
http://www.nieuwsblad.be/cnt/a03i56b4
http://www.gettyimages.com/detail/news-photo/belgiums-anja-van-damme-and-polands-milena-rosner-in-action-news-photo/77039022#belgiums-anja-van-damme-and-polands-milena-rosner-in-action-during-picture-id77039022

1986 births
Living people
Belgian women's volleyball players
Place of birth missing (living people)
Wing spikers
21st-century Belgian women